Juan Roberto Seminario Rodríguez (born 22 July 1936 in Piura, Peru) is a retired Peruvian football player, recognized as one of Peru's most important strikers. Nicknamed "El Loco" he is the only Zaragoza player to have won the "Pichichi Trophy" (1961–62 La Liga).

He played for several clubs, notably Spanish clubs Real Zaragoza and FC Barcelona, Sporting CP of Portugal, as well as Italian club Fiorentina. He also won the Inter-Cities Fairs Cup 1965-66 with FC Barcelona.

Career
Seminario started his career in 1954 playing for Deportivo Municipal where he played until 1959. During this time he made 19 appearances for the Peru national team. On 17 May 1959 he scored a hat-trick against England in a 4–1 win, in Lima.

In 1959 he moved to Europe, joining Sporting CP of Portugal, where he would play 50 matches and score 21 goals, and be nicknamed Expresso de Lima.

In 1961 he moved on to join Real Zaragoza in Spain where he became the top scorer in La Liga (with 25 goals in 30 matches) for the 1961–62 season. Before he was sold to Italy, he would play 8 matches and score 8 goals in the Zaragoza.

In 1963 he joined Fiorentina of Italy before returning to Spain in 1964 to play for Barcelona where he was part of the squad that won the Inter-Cities Fairs Cup in 1965–66. He later had a spell with Sabadell before returning to Peru in 1969 to play for Atlético Grau.

Honours as a player
1962 – Pichichi Trophy
1966 – Inter-Cities Fairs Cup winner (FC Barcelona)

Career statistics

References

External links
 lpf career statistics

1936 births
Living people
People from Piura
Peruvian footballers
Association football forwards
Deportivo Municipal footballers
Sporting CP footballers
Real Zaragoza players
FC Barcelona players
CE Sabadell FC footballers
ACF Fiorentina players
Atlético Grau footballers
Peruvian Primera División players
Primeira Liga players
La Liga players
Serie A players
Pichichi Trophy winners
Peru international footballers
Peruvian expatriate footballers
Peruvian expatriate sportspeople in Portugal
Peruvian expatriate sportspeople in Spain
Peruvian expatriate sportspeople in Italy
Expatriate footballers in Portugal
Expatriate footballers in Spain
Expatriate footballers in Italy